The Indian Newspaper Society (INS; formerly Indian and Eastern Newspaper Society) acts as the central organization of the Press of India, an independent body authenticating circulation figures of newspapers and periodicals in India. It plays a major role in protecting and promoting freedom of the press in India. The society was founded in 1939. Its headquarters are at Rafi Marg, New Delhi.

INS membership comprises the owners, proprietors and publishers of print media who discusses and suggest various measures to the government regarding the problems related to the newspaper industry. It is a kind of pressure group which works to protect the interest of newspaper industry in particular and print media in general.

The Indian newspaper industry today faces problems ranging from rising cost and paucity of newsprint to shrinking revenue from advertisements due to the rise of online media. The executive committee of INS represents 990 members, ranging from newspapers and journals to periodicals and magazines.

K. Raja Prasad Reddy of Sakshi (Media Group) is the current president of the society. for the year 2022–23.

On 27 February 2014, the society marked its platinum jubilee with a celebration at Vigyan Bhavan, New Delhi. The President of India, Mr. Pranab Mukherjee, was chief guest and gave away commemorative plaques to extant founding members – Bombay Chronicle, The Hindu, The Hindustan Times, The Pioneer, The Statesman, The Times of India and The Tribune. On this occasion, President Mukherjee was also presented the first copy of a book Threescore and Fifteen – The Story of the Indian Newspaper Society written by INS president Ravindra Kumar. Priced at Rs 399, the book chronicles the accomplishments of and challenges faced by the society and is vital reading for media practitioners and policy makers. Copies can be ordered from the INS secretariat at Rafi Marg, New Delhi.

Presidents
The presidents of INS include:
 G. Narasimhan (1956–57)
 Upendra Acharya, 1958–1959
 Sahu Ramesh Chandra Jain
 Kundan Vyas
 Ashish Bagga
 Present: Ravindra Kumar
 Hormusji. N. Kama
 PV Chandran
 Somesh Sharma
 Akila Urankar
 Jayant Mammen Mathew
 Mr. Shailesh Gupta
 L. Adimoolam
 Mohit Jain
 K. Raja Prasad Reddy

References

External links
 
 Photo Guide: Round the clock at Dainik Bhaskar, June 2010
 Opinion - A mission lost in petty politicking, The Hindu, 20 September 2006
 History in Lahore: The Indian Newspaper Society meet, The Hindu, 25 June 2005
 

Newspaper associations
Newspaper Society
Organizations established in 1939
Newspaper publishing in India
1939 establishments in India